Sitalpati (Bengali:শীতল পাটি), also called sital pati and sittal pati, is a kind of mat which feels cold by nature. It is made from murta plants (Schumannianthus dichotomus). It is usually used in Bangladesh (and to a lesser extent, India's West Bengal). Mats with decorative designs are called nakshi pati.

The murta plant grows around water bodies in Sylhet, Sunamganj, Barisal, Tangail, Comilla, Noakhali, Feni and Chittagong. Nakshi pati made of murta plants is available only in Sylhet and Noakhali districts of Bangladesh. In India, Sitalpati is made in the northern Cooch Behar district of the state of West Bengal. Among the areas of Cooch Behar where Sitalpatis are woven, Sagareswar, Ghugumari and Pashnadanga are important centres.

Recognition 
UNESCO has recognised the Traditional Art of Shital Pati weaving of Sylhet and included it in the Representative List of the Intangible Cultural Heritage of Humanity.

See also
 Nakshi kantha, decorative quilts made from cloth

References

External links 
 Shital pati of Assam
 Shital pati in Bangladesh

Bangladeshi culture
Floors
Bangladeshi handicrafts
Sylhet Division